The String Quartet No. 21 in D major, K. 575, was written in June 1789 by Wolfgang Amadeus Mozart.  It has acquired the nickname The Violet, used for example in Hans Keller's chapter of The Mozart Companion. It is the first of the Prussian Quartets.

There are four movements:

Allegretto, in D major
Andante, in A major
Menuetto: Allegretto, in D major with a trio section in G major
Allegretto in D major

The quartet was written for and dedicated to the King of Prussia, Friedrich Wilhelm II, an amateur cellist, and was written in a similar style to the quartets of Joseph Haydn. Mozart and his friend Karl Lichnowsky met the king in Potsdam in April 1789. Mozart played before the king in Berlin on 26 May 1789, then returned to Vienna.

This string quartet is a popular piece in the repertoire today. It is a piece written at the zenith of Mozart's powers as a chamber music composer. It is considered to be in a more relaxed style than the six quartets dedicated to Haydn. A typical performance lasts around 24 minutes.

The middle part of the song "Mozart's House" by UK based indie electronic band Clean Bandit samples the piece. The song reached number 17 in the UK Singles Chart on 21 April 2013.

References

External links
 

21
1789 compositions
Compositions in D major